A list of the films produced in Mexico in 1970 (see 1970 in film):

See also
1970 in Mexico

External links

1970
Films
Lists of 1970 films by country or language